Guzy may refer to:

Places
Guzy, Podlaskie Voivodeship (north-east Poland)
Guzy, Pomeranian Voivodeship (north Poland)
Guzy, Warmian-Masurian Voivodeship (north Poland)
Wierzbice-Guzy (east-central Poland)

Other uses
Guzy (surname)